Multi Kontra Culti vs. Irony is the second album by Gogol Bordello. It was released on 17 September 2002 by Rubric Records.

"Occurrence on the Border (Hopping on a Pogo-Gypsy Stick)" and "Through the Roof 'n' Underground" were featured on the soundtrack to the 2006 film Wristcutters: A Love Story.

Track listing

References

2002 albums
Gogol Bordello albums
Rubric Records albums